Montenegro competed at the 2013 World Aquatics Championships in Barcelona, Spain between 19 July to 4 August 2013.

Medalists

Water polo

Men's tournament

Team roster 
Zdravko Radić
Draško Brguljan
Vjekoslav Pasković
Antonio Petrović
Darko Brguljan
Ugo Crousillat
Mlađan Janović
Nikola Janović
Aleksandar Ivović
Sasa Misić
Filip Klikovać
Predrag Jokić
Miloš Šćepanović

Group play

Round of 16

Quarterfinal

Semifinal

Final

References

}

Nations at the 2013 World Aquatics Championships
2013 in Montenegrin sport
Montenegro at the World Aquatics Championships